The 52nd Infantry Division (52-ya Pekhotnaya Diviziya) was an infantry formation of the Russian Imperial Army.

Organization
1st Brigade
205th Infantry Regiment
206th Infantry Regiment
2nd Brigade
207th Infantry Regiment
208th Infantry Regiment
52nd Artillery Brigade

References

Infantry divisions of the Russian Empire
Military units and formations disestablished in 1918